The Curtiss T-32 Condor II was a 1930s American biplane airliner and bomber aircraft built by the Curtiss Aeroplane and Motor Company. It was used by the United States Army Air Corps as an executive transport.

Development
The Condor II was a 1933 two-bay biplane of mixed construction with a single vertical stabilizer and rudder, and retractable landing gear. It was powered by two Wright Cyclone radial engines. The first aircraft was flown on 30 January 1933 and a production batch of 21 aircraft was then built. The production aircraft were fitted out as 12-passenger luxury night sleeper transports. They entered service with Eastern Air Transport and American Airways, forerunners of Eastern Air Lines and American Airlines on regular night services for the next three years.  The June 15, 1934 American Airlines system timetable marketed its Condors as being "The World's First Complete Sleeper-Planes" with these 12-passenger aircraft being equipped with sleeper berths and also being capable of cruising at 190 miles per hour.  An example of the Condor services operated by American were daily overnight flights between Dallas and Los Angeles during the mid 1930s with a routing of Dallas–Ft. Worth–Abilene–Big Spring, TX–El Paso–Douglas, AZ–Tucson–Phoenix–Los Angeles.

The Colombian Air Force operated three BT-32 equipped with floats in the Colombia-Peru War in 1933.

Two modified T-32s were bought by the United States Army Air Corps (designated YC-30) for use as executive transports. One Condor was converted with extra fuel tanks and used by the 1939–1941 United States Antarctic Service Expedition, and, unique for a Condor, had a fixed undercarriage to allow use on floats or skis. Some aircraft were later modified to AT-32 standard with variable-pitch propellers and improved engine nacelles. The AT-32D variant could be converted from sleeper configuration to daytime use with 15 seats. Four T-32s operating in the United Kingdom were pressed into service with the Royal Air Force at the outbreak of World War II.

Eight bomber variants (BT-32) were built with manually operated machine gun turrets in the nose and above the rear fuselage. All these aircraft were exported. A military cargo version (CT-32) was also built for Argentina. It had a large loading door on the starboard side of the fuselage.

Variants

T-32
Production luxury night sleeper, 21 built including two as YC-30s
T-32C
Ten T-32s modified to AT-32 standard.
AT-32A
Variant with variable-pitch propellers and 710 hp (529 kW) Wright SGR-1820-F3 Cyclone engines, three built.
AT-32B
An AT-32 variant with 720 hp (537 kW) Wright SGR-1820-F2 Cyclone engines, three built.
AT-32C
An AT-32 variant, one built for Swissair.
AT-32D
An AT-32 variant with 720 hp (537 kW) Wright SGR-1820-F3 Cyclone engines, one built.
AT-32E
AT-32 variant for the United States Navy as the R4C-1, two built.
BT-32
Bomber variant, eight built.
CT-32
Military cargo variant with large cargo door, three built.
YC-30
United States Army Air Corps designation for two T-32s.

R4C-1
United States Navy designation for two AT-32Es (one for United States Marine Corps) both later to the United States Antarctic Survey.

Operators

Civil operators

LAN-Chile operated three former American Airlines aircraft

China National Aviation Corporation operated six AT-32E freighters

SACO/AVIANCA operated 2

Swissair

International Air Freight, Croydon operated  four T-32s.

American Airways (subsequently renamed American Airlines)
Eastern Air Transport (subsequently renamed Eastern Air Lines)

Military operators

Argentine Naval Aviation operated three aircraft of the CT-32 variant, one as a crew trainer and two as freighters.

Chinese Nationalist Air Force operated BT-32 variant.

Colombian Air Force operated three BT-32 variants on floats.

Honduran Air Force

Peruvian Air Force operated BT-32 variant.

Royal Air Force – Four T-32 variants impressed from International Air Freight. Not used in service and scrapped at No 30 Maintenance Unit. RAF Sealand.

United States Army Air Corps operated two YC-30 aircraft.
United States Marine Corps received one R4C-1 aircraft.
United States Navy received one R4C-1 aircraft.

Accidents and incidents
On 27 July 1934, Swissair Condor CH-170 broke up in mid-air and crashed at Tuttlingen, Germany killing all 12 passengers and crew.

Specifications (AT-32C Condor II)

See also

References

Sources
 Andrade, John M. U.S.Military Aircraft Designations and Serials since 1909. Earl Shilton, Leicester, UK: Midland Counties Publications, 1979. . (Page 63 and 214)
 Bowers, Peter M. Curtiss Aircraft 1907–1947. London: Putnam & CompanyLtd., 1979. .
 
 Taylor, H.A. "The Uncompetitive Condor" AirEnthusiast Six, March–June 1978. Bromley, Kent, UK: Pilot Press Ltd., 1978.  
 The Illustrated Encyclopedia of Aircraft (Part Work 1982–1985). Orbis Publishing, 1985.

External links

USAF Museum C-30 factsheet 
USAF Museum YC-30 factsheet
 History of the Argentine Naval Aviation CT-32s

T-32 Condor II
1930s United States airliners
1930s United States military transport aircraft
1930s United States bomber aircraft
Aircraft first flown in 1933
Biplanes
Twin piston-engined tractor aircraft